Count Raoul de Vitry d'Avaucourt (1895-1977)  was a French aristocrat and business executive. He served as the chief executive officer of Pechiney from 1958 to 1967, then France's largest aluminium producer.

Early life
Raoul de Vitry was born on June 28, 1895. His father was Marie-Hyacinthe-Fernand de Vitry d'Avaucourt and his mother, Marie-Élisabeth-Louise de Louvencourt.

De Vitry graduated from the École Polytechnique in 1914. During World War I, he served in the French Army from 1914 to 1919. He graduated from the École des Mines de Paris in 1922.

Career
De Vitry joined Pechiney in 1927. He joined its board of directors in 1931. By 1938, he was appointed as its general manager. During World War II, he supported the French Resistance financially. He served as the chief executive officer of Pechiney from 1958 to 1967, when it was France's largest aluminium producer. De Vitry believed in working through "a planning system", including making five-year plans for company investments. Meanwhile, he believed in promoting or demoting employees depending on their performance regardless of their initial credentials.

De Vitry was the co-founder of the American Research and Development Corporation. He served on the board of directors of the Digital Equipment Corporation.

De Vitry was a donor to INSEAD, where his name is inscribed on a plaque in the entrance.

De Vitry was the recipient of the Croix de Guerre for his World War I service. He was also a Commander of the Legion of Honour, a Grand-Officer of the National Order of Merit.

Personal life and death
De Vitry married Marie-Claire-Henriette-Nicole Le Bret. They had ten children, including four sons who, like him, attended the École Polytechnique . He was the father-in-law of Marc Julia.  He died on October 5, 1977.

References

1895 births
1977 deaths
Counts of France
French military personnel of World War I
École Polytechnique alumni
Mines Paris - PSL alumni
French chief executives
French corporate directors
Recipients of the Croix de Guerre 1914–1918 (France)
Commandeurs of the Légion d'honneur
Grand Officers of the Ordre national du Mérite